Tonashen or Tapakend is a village de facto in the Martakert Province of the breakaway Republic of Artsakh, de jure in the Tartar District of Azerbaijan, in the disputed region of Nagorno-Karabakh. The village has an ethnic Armenian-majority population, and also had an Armenian majority in 1989.

History 
During the Soviet period, the village was a part of the Mardakert District of the Nagorno-Karabakh Autonomous Oblast.

Historical heritage sites 
Historical heritage sites in and around the village include the fortress of Jraberd from between the 9th and 18th centuries, a medieval church, a 12th/13th-century cemetery, a 13th-century khachkar, the medieval village of Mets Tvot, the 13th-century church of Kotrats Yeghtsi, and the monastery of Yerits Mankants built in 1691.

Economy and culture 
The population is mainly engaged in agriculture and animal husbandry. As of 2015, the village has a municipal building, a secondary school, and a medical centre.

Demographics 
The village had 79 inhabitants in 2005, and 84 inhabitants in 2015.

References

External links 
 

Populated places in Martakert Province
Populated places in Tartar District